Valentine Charles Browne, 5th Earl of Kenmare (1 December 1860 – 14 November 1941), styled Viscount Castlerosse from 1871 to 1905, was an Irish peer who served in the Senate of Southern Ireland, and was Lord Lieutenant of Kerry.

Public life
Lord Castlerosse was a lieutenant of 4th (Militia) Battalion, Worcestershire and Sherwood Foresters. He was appointed Master of the Horse to the Lord Lieutenant of Ireland (a position in the Viceregal household) in January 1903, and served as such until his succession as Earl of Kenmare in 1905.

As Earl of Kenmare he was a peer of the realm and though he was a Roman Catholic, he was also a unionist, which was uncommon at the time for Roman Catholics. He sat in the House of Lords as a member of the Irish Unionist Alliance. He also was a member of the Senate of Southern Ireland in 1921, but did not attend. Browne took an active part in the military, becoming colonel of Royal Munster Fusiliers, and King's Regiment (Liverpool).

He married Elizabeth Baring, daughter of Baron Revelstoke. His daughter, Lady Dorothy Margaret, married Lord Edward Arthur Grosvenor, youngest son of The 1st Duke of Westminster. He was succeeded by his son, Valentine Browne, 6th Earl of Kenmare.

On his death in 1941 aged 80, he was buried in the family vault in Killarney Cathedral.

References

Book link

1860 births
1941 deaths
Irish unionists
Irish Unionist Party politicians
Lord-Lieutenants of Kerry
Members of the Senate of Southern Ireland
Kenmare, Valentine Browne, 9th Viscount
5
Valentine